Big Egos...No Ideas is the debut album by American punk rock band Frickin' A, released in 2004.

Track listing

2004 debut albums